Calliotropis nomismasimilis is a species of sea snail, a marine gastropod mollusk in the family Eucyclidae.

Description
The size of the shell varies between 4 mm and 8 mm.

Distribution
This species occurs in the Pacific Ocean off the Solomon Islands.

References

 Vilvens C. (2007) New records and new species of Calliotropis from Indo-Pacific. Novapex 8 (Hors Série 5): 1–72.

External links
 

nomismasimilis
Gastropods described in 2007